Bee sting is the sting from a bee.

Bee sting and similar may also refer to:
"Beesting", a song by Ugly Casanova from their 2002 album Sharpen Your Teeth
"Bee-Sting", a 2018 song by The Wombats
"Bee Sting", a cocktail made from whiskey and vodka
Beestings, a word for colostrum, a form of milk produced in late pregnancy when lactation starts.
beasting, a type of Army discipline.
Bienenstich, or Bee Sting Cake.

See also
Stinger